Phil Murphy (born 1957) is an American financier, diplomat, politician and Governor of New Jersey.

Phil or Philip Murphy may also refer to:

Phil Murphy (rugby union, born 1976), Canadian rugby union player
Phil Murphy (rugby union, born 1980), English rugby union player
Phil Murphy (footballer) (born 1960), English footballer
Phil Murphy (American football) (born 1957), American football defensive tackle
Philip Francis Murphy (1933–1999), American clergyman